Demi Schuurs and Katarina Srebotnik were the defending champions, but chose not to participate together. Schuurs was scheduled to play alongside Anna-Lena Grönefeld, but the team withdrew before their first round match. Srebotnik teamed up with Raquel Atawo, but lost in the semifinals to Gabriela Dabrowski and Xu Yifan.

Dabrowski and Xu went on to win the title, defeating Sharon Fichman and Nicole Melichar in the final 4–6, 7–6(7–5), [10–5].

Seeds

Draw

Draw

References

External links
 Main Draw

Nurnberger Versicherungscupandnbsp;- Doubles
2019 Doubles
Nurnberger Versicherungscupandnbsp;- Doubles